John Penruddock (bef. 1542 – 8 March 1601) was an English politician.

He was a Member (MP) of the Parliament of England for Wilton in 1584 and Southampton in 1586.

References

1601 deaths
Year of birth uncertain
English MPs 1584–1585
English MPs 1586–1587